Alena Procházková (born 9 August 1984) is a Slovak cross-country skier who has competed since 2002. Competing in four Winter Olympics, she earned her best finish of 18th in the individual sprint event at Vancouver in 2010.

Procházková's best finish at the FIS Nordic World Ski Championships was sixth place in the individual sprint in 2011.

Her lone World Cup victory was during the test event at Whistler Olympic Park in Canada which was a test event for the 2010 Winter Olympics.

Cross-country skiing results
All results are sourced from the International Ski Federation (FIS).

Olympic Games

World Championships

World Cup

Season standings

Individual podiums
1 victory – (1 ) 
6 podiums – (5 , 1 )

References

External links
 
 
 
 

1984 births
Cross-country skiers at the 2006 Winter Olympics
Cross-country skiers at the 2010 Winter Olympics
Cross-country skiers at the 2014 Winter Olympics
Cross-country skiers at the 2018 Winter Olympics
Cross-country skiers at the 2022 Winter Olympics
Living people
Olympic cross-country skiers of Slovakia
Slovak female cross-country skiers
Universiade medalists in cross-country skiing
Sportspeople from Banská Bystrica
Universiade gold medalists for Slovakia
Universiade silver medalists for Slovakia
Cross-country skiers at the 2007 Winter Universiade
Competitors at the 2011 Winter Universiade
Medalists at the 2007 Winter Universiade